Basket Navarra Club is a professional Basketball team based in Pamplona, Navarra. The team currently plays in league LEB Plata.

History
Basket Navarra Club was founded in 2007 with the aim of creating a professional basketball team in Navarra. The club played its first year at LEB Bronce, league created in that season as the fourth division in Spanish basketball.

After this first year, the club achieved a vacant berth in LEB Plata. In their second season at this league, the club played the semifinals of the promotion playoffs, but were defeated by CB Tíjola.

On 2010, Basket Navarra Club clinched the spot of Bàsquet Mallorca at LEB Oro, the second division. Navarra reached the promotion playoffs to Liga ACB but were defeated by Ford Burgos in the quarterfinals round by 3–1. The next season, the 2011–12 was the best one in the history of the club, reaching the semifinals of the promotion playoffs to Liga ACB.

In 2014, due to the existence of vacant berths, Navarra remained in LEB Oro despite being qualified in the last position after a season marked as "an absurdity".

Two years later, Navarra was again relegated to LEB Plata, this time not remaining in LEB Oro.

Home arenas
Polideportivo Arrosadia 2007–2009, 2018–present
Polideportivo Anaitasuna 2009–2016
Pabellón Universitario de Navarra 2016–2018

Sponsorship naming

Basket Navarra Club had several denominations through the years due to its sponsorship:

HNV-Consmetal Navarra: 2007–08
HNV Duar Navarra: 2008–09
Grupo Iruña Navarra: 2009–12
Planasa Navarra: 2012–2016
AECC Navarra: 2016

Season by season

Trophies and awards

Individual awards
LEB Oro MVP
Ondřej Starosta – 2013
Óliver Arteaga – 2016
All-LEB Oro Team
Ondřej Starosta – 2013
Pablo Almazán – 2015
Óliver Arteaga – 2016

Current roster

Notes

References

External links
Official website

Basketball teams in Spain
Sport in Pamplona
LEB Oro teams
Sports teams in Navarre